Yuanshan is a metro station in Taipei, Taiwan served by Taipei Metro. There was a station of the same name on the now-defunct Tamsui railway line.

Station overview

The two-level, elevated station structure with one island platform and two exits. The station is situated on the West of Yumen Street, between Kulun Street and Jiuquan Street. The washrooms are inside the entrance area. Notable landmarks are Taipei Expo Park, Chungshan Soccer Stadium, The Grand Hotel, Republic of China Military Police Headquarters, Yuanshan Park and Keelung River.

In anticipation of the 2010 Taipei International Flora Exposition, this station became the first elevated, high-capacity station in the system with automatic platform gates installed.

History
South of the former station was a branch line to the Tatung Steel Factory. Now, it is the site of Tatung Company. It was however, closed on 15 July 1988. The Taipei Metro station opened on 28 March 1997.

Station layout

Around the station
 Linji Huguo Chan Temple
 Lin An Tai Historical House and Museum
 Tatung University

References

Tamsui–Xinyi line stations
Railway stations opened in 1901
Railway stations closed in 1988
Railway stations opened in 1997